The Ceropalinae are a subfamily of the Pompilidae, the spider wasps, containing two genera, whose members are kleptoparasitic on other solitary wasps which hunt spiders, mainly fellow members of the Pompilidae.

The two genera within the Ceropalinae are 

Ceropales Latreille, 1796
Irenangelus Schultz 1906

References

 
Apocrita subfamilies